The Nike stage or Nike booster, a solid fuel rocket motor, was created by Hercules Aerospace for the Nike Ajax (M5) Nike Hercules (M5E1) (and M88 late in Hercules career). It was developed for use as the first stage of the Nike Ajax and Nike Hercules missiles as part of Project Nike.

It was subsequently employed in a variety of missiles and multi-stage sounding rockets, becoming one of the most popular and reliable rocket stages, not only in the United States, but also in several other countries around the world.

Sounding rockets based on Nike Booster

The Nike Deacon has a ceiling of 189 km, a takeoff thrust of 217 kN, a takeoff weight of 710 kg, a diameter of 0.42 m and a length of 7.74 m.
 The Nike Javelin was launched 34 times between 1964 and 1978. The maximum flight altitude of the Nike Javelin was 130 km, the takeoff thrust 217 kN, takeoff weight 900 kg, 0.42 m and length 8.20 m.
 The Nike Malemute consists of a Nike starting stage and a Malemute upper stage.
The Nike Orion has a Nike base stage, taken from U.S. Army surplus stocks, and an Orion upper stage. The first Nike-Orion rocket was launched on February 26, 1977, and had more than 175 launches through the 2000s.

The Nike Recruit has an apogee of 5 km, a liftoff thrust of 217 kN, a total mass of 1100 kg and a total length of 8.00 m.
 The Nike Tomahawk has a Nike rocket as the first stage, and a Tomahawk rocket as the second. The Nike Tomahawk was launched 395 times between June 25, 1963, and November 27, 1995. One of its launches was in 1966 on the beach in Cassino, Rio Grande, Brazil.
 The Nike Viper consists of a Nike starting stage and a Viper upper stage. The Nike Viper has a ceiling of 80 km, a takeoff thrust of 217 kN (48,800 lbf), a takeoff weight of 600 kg and a length of 8.00 m.

See also
 Nike Smoke rocket

References

Books

External links
 U.S. Naval Research Lab. - Nike Booster
 Smithsonian National Air and Space Museum - Fins, Set of Four, Rocket, Nike Booster, Nike-Cajun
 Encyclopedia Astronautica - Nike

Rocket stages